High Society is a 1924 American short silent comedy film directed by Robert F. McGowan. It was the 29th Our Gang short subject released.

Plot
Mickey lives a simple but satisfying life with his Uncle Patrick. His wealthy Aunt Kate petitions and wins custody of Mickey, forcing him to leave his home and his uncle, his friends, and his dog behind. Fighting with his cousin Percy and forced to take daily baths and manicures, Mickey is miserable. He writes a letter to Uncle Pat asking him and the gang to come visit.

During their visit the gang destroys the house, including swinging from the chandelier and skating on a liquid soap 'ice rink' in the kitchen. An alarm is sent out, bringing the police, the fire department, an ambulance, and others to the house just as Aunt Kate arrives home. Seeing the destruction and realizing her mistake in bringing Mickey to her home, Aunt Kate asks Uncle Pat to take Mickey back, to both of their delight.

Cast

The Gang
 Joe Cobb as Joe
 Jackie Condon as Percival "Percy" Kelly
 Mickey Daniels as Mickey Kelly
 Allen Hoskins as Farina
 Mary Kornman as Mary
 Andy Samuel as Andy
 Sonny Loy as Sing Joy
 Pal the Dog as himself

Additional cast
 Patrick Kelly as Uncle Pat Kelly
 Evelyn Burns as Aunt Kate Kelly
 F. F. Guenste as butler
 Sam Lufkin as police detective
 Charles A. Bachman as police detective
 Jack Gavin as police detective

References

External links

1924 films
1924 short films
1924 comedy films
American silent short films
American black-and-white films
Films directed by Robert F. McGowan
Films with screenplays by H. M. Walker
Hal Roach Studios short films
Our Gang films
1920s American films
Silent American comedy films